Grigoraș Diaconescu (born 7 October 1982) is a Romanian rugby union football player. He plays as a scrum-half for professional SuperLiga club Steaua București. He also plays for Romania's national team, the Oaks, making his international debut during the 2015 season of 2014–16 European Nations Cup First Division in a match against the Os Lobos.

Career
Besides playing for Steaua București, Grigoraș Diaconescu played for Périgueux and for a short period for Saint Junien.

References

External links

1982 births
Living people
Romanian rugby union players
Romania international rugby union players
București Wolves players
CSA Steaua București (rugby union) players
Rugby union scrum-halves